Laderas del Genil (previously called Granada Sur-Oeste) is a Spanish geographical indication for Vino de la Tierra wines located in the autonomous region of Andalusia. Vino de la Tierra is one step below the mainstream Denominación de Origen indication on the Spanish wine quality ladder.

The area covered by this geographical indication comprises the wine-producing area in the southwest of the province of Granada (Andalusia, Spain).

It acquired its Vino de la Tierra status in 2003.

Grape varieties
 Red: Garnacha tinta, Pinot noir, Syrah, Cabernet Sauvignon, Tempranillo, Merlot and Perruna
 White: Vijiriego, Pedro Ximénez, Chardonnay, Moscatel de Alejandría, Palomino, Macabeo and Sauvignon blanc

References

Spanish wine
Wine regions of Spain
Appellations